The Allied Quality Assurance Publications (AQAP) are standards for quality assurance systems developed by NATO

The aim of the AQAP agreement is to define standards for Quality Assurance of defence products. These standards are an integral part of contracts awarded in the military field involving NATO member countries. AQAP documents are therefore important to contractors and companies wanting to bid for such contracts.

The AQAP system is described in Standardization Agreement 4107 issued by the NATO Standardization Agency. There are currently two main types of AQAP documents; Contractual Type which are written as a Technical Specification intended for contractual use; and Guidance Type which provide general guidance.

List of current AQAP publications 
 AQAP 2000 NATO Policy on an Integrated Systems Approach to Quality through the Life Cycle 
 AQAP 2070 NATO Mutual Government Quality Assurance (GQA) Process
 AQAP 2105 NATO Requirements for Deliverable Quality Plans
 AQAP 2110 NATO Quality Assurance Requirements for Design, Development and Production
 AQAP 2131 NATO Quality Assurance Requirements for Final Inspection
 AQAP 2210 NATO Supplementary Software Quality Assurance Requirements to AQAP 2110
 AQAP 2310 NATO Quality Management System Requirements for Aviation, Space and Defence Suppliers

See also 
 Quality management system
 ISO 9000
 AS 9100 - aerospace industry implementation of ISO 9000/1

External links

References

Quality management
NATO Standardization Agreements